Erling Kristvik (30 August 1882 – 9 January 1969) was a Norwegian educationalist. He was born in Kornstad. He served as rector at the School of education in Volda from 1930 to 1946, and was appointed professor at Norwegian College of Teaching in Trondheim from 1946 to 1952. Among his books are Læraryrket from 1925, Sjelelære from 1937, and Elevkunne from 1939.

References

1882 births
1969 deaths
People from Averøy
Norwegian educationalists
Norwegian non-fiction writers
Norwegian education writers
Norwegian prisoners and detainees
Prisoners and detainees of Germany
Volda University College alumni
20th-century non-fiction writers